Catache District is one of eleven districts of the province Santa Cruz in Peru.

See also
Bosques Nublados de Udima Wildlife Refuge

References